Stanley Kubrick (1928–1999) directed thirteen feature films and  three short documentaries over the course of his career. His work as a director, spanning diverse genres, is widely regarded as being extremely influential.

Kubrick made his directorial debut in 1951 with the documentary short Day of the Fight, followed by Flying Padre later that year. In 1953, he directed his first feature film, Fear and Desire. The anti-war allegory's themes reappeared in his later films. His next works were the film noir pictures Killer's Kiss (1955) and The Killing (1956). Critic Roger Ebert praised The Killing and retrospectively called it Kubrick's "first mature feature". Kubrick then directed two Hollywood films starring Kirk Douglas: Paths of Glory (1957) and Spartacus (1960). The latter won the Golden Globe Award for Best Motion Picture – Drama. His next film was Lolita (1962), an adaptation of Vladimir Nabokov's novel of the same name. It was nominated for the Academy Award for Best Adapted Screenplay. His 1964 film, the Cold War satire Dr. Strangelove featuring Peter Sellers and George C. Scott, received the BAFTA Award for Best Film. Along with The Killing, it remains the highest rated film directed by Kubrick according to Rotten Tomatoes.

In 1968, Kubrick directed the space epic 2001: A Space Odyssey. Now widely regarded as among the most influential films ever made, 2001 garnered Kubrick his only personal Academy Award for his work as director of special effects. His next project, the dystopian A Clockwork Orange (1971), was an initially X-rated adaptation of Anthony Burgess' 1962 novella. After reports of crimes inspired by the film's depiction of "ultra-violence", Kubrick had the film withdrawn from distribution in the United Kingdom. Kubrick then directed the period piece Barry Lyndon (1975), in a departure from his two previous futuristic films. It did not perform well commercially and received mixed reviews, but won four Oscars at the 48th Academy Awards. In 1980, Kubrick adapted a Stephen King novel into The Shining, starring Jack Nicholson and Shelley Duvall. Although Kubrick was nominated for a Golden Raspberry Award for Worst Director, The Shining is now widely regarded as one of the greatest horror films ever made. Seven years later, he released the Vietnam War film Full Metal Jacket. It remains the highest rated of Kubrick's later films according to Rotten Tomatoes and Metacritic. In the early 1990s, Kubrick abandoned his plans to direct a Holocaust film titled The Aryan Papers.  He was hesitant to compete with Steven Spielberg's Schindler's List and had become "profoundly depressed" after working extensively on the project. His final film, the erotic thriller Eyes Wide Shut starring Tom Cruise and Nicole Kidman, was released posthumously in 1999. An unfinished project that Kubrick referred to as Pinocchio was completed by Spielberg as A.I. Artificial Intelligence (2001).

In 1997, the Venice Film Festival awarded Kubrick the Golden Lion for Lifetime Achievement. That same year, he received a Directors Guild of America Lifetime Achievement Award, then called the D.W. Griffith Award. In 1999, the British Academy of Film and Television Arts (BAFTA) presented Kubrick with a Britannia Award. After his death, BAFTA renamed the award in his honor: "The Stanley Kubrick Britannia Award for Excellence in Film". He was posthumously awarded a BAFTA Fellowship in 2000.

Films

Feature films

Documentary shorts

Critical response

See also
 List of accolades received by Stanley Kubrick
 List of recurring cast members in Stanley Kubrick films
 Stanley Kubrick bibliography
 Stanley Kubrick's unrealized projects

References

External links
Stanley Kubrick on IMDb
Stanley Kubrick at Rotten Tomatoes
Work and Life of Stanley Kubrick, an educational site

Kubrick, Stanley
Stanley Kubrick
American filmographies